Ralf W. Wilhelms is a retired German association football defender who played professionally in Germany and the United States.  He coached in the United States and Hungary and served in various executive positions with American soccer teams for over a decade.  He is a professor at Lake Superior State University in Strategic Management and International Business.

Player
Wilhelms played for Borussia Mönchengladbach from 1979 to 82 and Bonner SC from 1982 to 86.  He moved to the United States to work on a graduate degree in business.  While in the United States, he came to the attention of Ron Newman, coach of the San Diego Sockers.   On 25 June 1987, the Sockers selected Wilhelms in the first round (seventh overall) of the Major Indoor Soccer League draft. He spent two seasons on the Sockers' backline.  In 1993, he played for the Arizona Sandsharks of the Continental Indoor Soccer League to then return to the San Diego Sockers for the 1994 season in the CISL.
Ralf Wilhelms scored 22 goals and recorded 25 assists in his 128-game career with the San Diego Sockers and Arizona Sandsharks in the US. He began playing during the 1987 season and last took the pitch during the 1994 campaign.

Team management
After his release by the Sockers in 1989, Wilhelms entered the U.S. International University.  On 31 July 1990, the school hired Wilhelms to coach its men's soccer team to a 5 win 12 loss season.  USIU had players from Brazil, Turkey, Great Britain, Germany, Spain, Portugal, United States, the Netherlands, African Nations, and the confluence of the world with the team proved to be challenging and brotherly. On 3 March 1995, he became an assistant coach with the San Diego Sockers. He held that position until 1996.  On 13 January 1998, he became the first head coach of the San Diego Flash. He took the team to an 8–5 record before leaving the team to become manager of Kerület FC. In 2001, Wilhelms joint Brian Quinn as his assistant coach to manage the San Diego Sockers in the Major Indoor Soccer League II. January 2004, Wilhelms became the executive vice president of Sockers.

Academics
In 1990, Willhelms received his Master of international Business and Administration from United States International University.  In 2008, he earned his Doctor of Business Administration from the Marshall Goldsmith School of Management at Alliant International University.  He is a professor at Lake Superior State University.

References

External links
 MISL stats

Living people
1962 births
Arizona Sandsharks players
Bonner SC players
Continental Indoor Soccer League players
German football managers
Major Indoor Soccer League (1978–1992) players
San Diego Sockers (original MISL) players
San Diego Sockers (CISL) players
USL First Division coaches
West German footballers
West German expatriate footballers
Association football defenders
Nemzeti Bajnokság I managers
West German expatriate sportspeople in the United States
German expatriate sportspeople in Hungary
West German football managers
German expatriate football managers
German expatriate sportspeople in the United States
Expatriate football managers in Hungary
Expatriate soccer managers in the United States